Wolfgang Lehmacher (born 1960 in Bonn, West Germany) is a thought leader, technology evangelist and practitioner in the field of supply chain, transport and logistics. Lehmacher has been involved in various initiatives in the supply chain industry. He is a writer and speaker. Important roles during his career include president and CEO of GeoPost Intercontinental and member of the executive board at GeoPost, the express parcel holding of French La Poste, and director of Supply Chain and Transport Industries at the World Economic Forum. 

Lehmacher is convinced that a performant supply chain, transport and logistics sector is the prerequisite for growth and wealth, prosperity and peace. In light of degrading environmental and social conditions, his aim is to promote well balanced business models at the nexus of economy, society, and environment. Sustainable business, global integration and collaboration are at the core of his interests.

His numerous publications, such as the books Wie Logistik unser Leben prägt (How Logistics Shapes Our Lives), Logistik im Zeichen der Urbanisierung (Logistics in Light of Urbanisation) and Global Supply Chain explain and stress the importance of supply chain, transport and logistics for economy and society as well as the need for the continuous transformation of the global economy towards a more circular and regenerative model. The books have been published at Springer Gabler. Moreover, he has contributed numerous articles to various publications and blogs, including Financial Times, Nikkei Asian Review, Business Insider, World Economic Forum Agenda and BVL-Blog. In addition, Lehmacher authored and co-authored several papers, such as "How Technology Can Unlock the Growth Potential along the New Silk Road", "Blockchain Technology for Ports", "Impact of the Fourth Industrial Revolution on Supply Chains" and "Trade Tech – A New Age for Trade and Supply Chain Finance".

Career
His beliefs and knowledge are rooted in his professional activities, responsibilities and experience in private and public companies as well as international organisations over more than three decades in numerous national, regional and global roles. In 1980 he joined German Red Cross organising global emergency transports. During his career, Lehmacher has been involved in various major change initiatives in the courier express parcel industry. Such projects include setting up GD Express Worldwide, the consortium of five major post offices – German, French, Dutch, Swedish and Canadian Post – in Germany (1991–1992), managing the joint venture between Deutsche Post and TNT Express Worldwide (1994–1996), launching the expansion of TNT Express Worldwide's business in the Eastern European and Eastern Mediterranean regions (1997–1999), and playing a major role in the European expansion of French La Poste (1999–2001) as well as the integration of the pan-European parcel network DPD into the French La Poste business (2001–2005). In his capacity as president and CEO of GeoPost Intercontinental, Lehmacher led the global expansion of the La Poste parcel business through a collaborative partnership model, resulting in a flexible, full coverage global network (2005-2010). Since 2010 he has continued to be involved in expansion and development projects as partner and managing director at the global strategy boutique CVA, overseeing the China/India business and leading the firm's transportation and logistics practice. He has been advisor to investors, private equity funds and start-ups. Lehmacher was also heading the Supply Chain and Transport Industries community at the World Economic Forum (2014-2018). Amongst other locations, he lived and worked in Paris, Shanghai, Hong Kong and New York.

Publications

 Co-author of the book  Intersection: Reimagining the future of mobility across traditional boundaries, SEA 2021
 Co-author of the book (English): Digitizing and Automating Processes in Logistics, in:  Disrupting Logistics: Startups, Technologies, and Investors Building Future Supply Chains  - 2021 (Springer Gabler, Deutschland)
Author of the book : Digital einkaufen: Warum wir unsere Wohnzimmer in Marktplätze verwandelt haben (Digital shopping: Why we have turned our living rooms into marketplaces) – 2017 Springer, Germany
 Author of the book (English): The Global Supply Chain. How Technology and Circular Thinking Transform Our Future  – 2017 Springer, Germany
 Author of the book : Steht unsere Versorgung auf dem Spiel? Über terroristische Bedrohungen entlang der Supply Chain ( (Is our supply at stake? Terrorist threats along the supply chain) – 2016 Springer Gabler, Germany
 Author of the book : Globale Supply Chain. Technischer Fortschritt, Transformation und Circular Economy (Global Supply Chain. Technological Progress, Transformation and Circular Economy) – 2016 Springer Gabler, Germany
 Author of the book : Logistik im Zeichen der Urbanisierung. Versorgung von Stadt und Land im digitalen und mobilen Zeitalter" (Logistics in Light of Urbanisation. Supply of Urban and Rural Areas in the Digital Age) – 2015; Springer Gabler, Germany
 Co-author of the book (Mandarin): China Supply Chain Management Blue Book – 2015; China Fortune Press, People's Republic of China
 Co-author FAZ-Jahrbuch Consulting : Digitale Revolution in der Supply Chain (Digital Revolution in the Supply Chain ) - 2014, FAZ-Jahrbuch Consulting (FAZ-Yearbook Consulting), Germany. 
 Co-author of the Praxishandbuch Logistik : Investitionen in Logistik und Infrastruktur in Deutschland und den BRICS (Investments in logistics and infrastructure in Germany and the BRICS) - 2013, WoltersKluwer 
 Author of the book : Wie Logistik unser Leben prägt. Der Wertbeitrag logistischer Lösungen für Wirtschaft und Gesellschaft  (How Logistics Shapes Our Lives),  – 2013 (Springer Gabler, Germany).
 Co-author of the book (English): The Secret Life of Decisions, How Unconscious Bias Subverts Your Judgement - 2013 (Gower Publishing, UK). 
 Co-author of the reference book : Fraud Management - Der Mensch als Schlüsselfaktor gegen Wirtschaftskriminalität - 2012 (Frankfurt School Verlag, Germany). 
In addition, Lehmacher is author of numerous articles and whitepapers, mainly covering innovative transportation and logistics topics.

Speaking events
Lehmacher has participated at numerous speaking events, a number of which have been held by the World Economic Forum. These include The Fallout: A New Global Corporate Landscape, Transforming Urban Transportation, The Asian Consumer: A Sustainability Champion in the Making? and Urbanization: The Unstoppable Global Trend.

Other notable speaking events include the Global Competitiveness Forum in Riyadh, the Boao Forum in China, The Economist World in Dubai, INK in association with TED, TPM Conferences, International Supply Chain Conference Berlin, Ti Transportation Intelligence conferences and the Horasis Global Russia Business Meeting. 
He also shared his knowledge at institutions such as the MIT Centre of Transportation and Logistics, the Frankfurt School and the Cologne Business School.

Memberships and affiliations
Lehmacher engages in various organizations and expert committees to foster innovation and sustainable practices in the supply chain, logistics and transport industries; for example, he is member of the advisory board of The Logistics and Supply Chain Management Society, Singapore, ambassador of the European Freight and Logistics Leaders Forum, Brussels, and founding member of the Logistikweisen, a logistics expert committee under the patronate of the German Federal Ministry for Digital and Transport (Bundesministerium für Digitales und Verkehr) and the think tank NEXST, initiated by Reefknot Investments, Kuehne & Nagel and SGInnovate, Singapore. He is member of BVL International and was member of the German Club of Logistics [1], He supports Global:SF, a not-for-profit organization dedicated to paving the way for international companies to locate, invest, and grow in the San Francisco Bay Area while helping locally based companies expand into global markets. He is member of the Board of Governors of the Universal Business School in Karjat, Western India, the first green Indian business school and was member of the advisory board of Aidha in Singapore, the world's first micro-business school. He advocates the principles underpinning the United Nations Global Compact (UNGC) and the 'Partnering Against Corruption Initiative' (PACI).[5]  Lehmacher joins regularly juries and evaluation committees of various organizations like the IATA Air Cargo Innovation Awards, the Automotive Logistics Awards Europe, the LogiSYM awards and the IDC Supply Chain Technology Leaders Recognition Program.

References

External links
 Post and Parcel Interview
 India Economic Summit 2009 – Transforming Urban Transportation. Retrieved 23 October 2013
 Horasis Global Russia Business Meeting 2010
 Establishing a Global Network through Collaboration 
 Forum Agenda (Blog of the World Economic Forum)
 Blog of the Logistics Association Germany, Bundesvereinigung Logistik (BVL)

1960 births
Living people
Businesspeople from Bonn
German businesspeople in transport